Ruben Hoepelman (born 30 August 1993) is a  Dutch male water polo player who plays at the goalkeeper position. He is part of the Netherlands men's national water polo team. He competed at the 2016 Men's European Water Polo Championship.

He is the son of the water polo player Andy Hoepelman. His brother Benjamin Hoepelman is also playing waterpolo.

References

1993 births
Living people
Dutch male water polo players
Place of birth missing (living people)
Sportspeople from Utrecht (city)
21st-century Dutch people